CarboTech AC GmbH is a producer of powdered, granulated and extruded activated carbons in Germany. The company has around 30 years of experience in the production and development of Carbon Molecular Sieves and has customers worldwide.

Profile
The company is located in the heart of the Ruhr metropolitan region (Essen, Germany) and operates integrated production plants for the manufacture, processing and packaging of activated carbons, activated cokes and Carbon Molecular Sieves. CarboTech AC GmbH provides a range of products which include:
 Granular Activated carbons
 Extruded Activated Carbons
 Powdered Activated Carbons
 Impregnated Activated Carbons
 Pool Activated Carbons
 Carbon Catalysts
 Carbon Molecular Sieves
 Mobile Adsorber Rentals
 Zeolites

History
The roots of CarboTech AC GmbH connect to the early 1938, when the foundation of the bituminous coal mining society (Steinkohlenbergbauvereins) has taken place. After World War II, the Bergwerksverband GmbH began setting up experimental facilities for the production and development of activated carbons from bituminous coal. In 1956, a large-scale pilot plant was commissioned on the site of the former Queen Elisabeth coal mine (Zeche Königin Elisabeth) in Essen and in 1958, foundation for the Bergbau-Forschung GmbH  as the research institute of bituminous coal mining was established. Later in the 1970s, the development of Carbon Molecular Sieves took place and this enabled the production of 99.999% pure nitrogen and hydrogen by Bergbau-Forschung GmbH. Between the years 1972 and 1980, Bergbau-Forschung received various patents  for Pressure swing adsorption plants for nitrogen production and hydrogen purification. In the year 1974, the reactivation of activated carbon using the fluidized bed method was developed by the Bergbau-Forschung. In 1980, a procedure of the dry DeSOx/DeNOx was developed. Until 1988, the activated carbon manufacturer Bergwerksverband was a 100% subsidiary of the Bergbau-Forschung. Later the company underwent several changes and expansions in the product range which include Powdered Activated Carbons and Impregnated Activated Carbons. Between the years 2001 and 2004, CarboTech Aktivkohlen GmbH had spin-off to Rütgers Chemicals AG, Rütgers CarboTech GmbH and finally in the year 2005, the company was taken over by International Chemical Investors Group. Later in the year 2006, the name of the company changed to CarboTech AC GmbH.

Group of CarboTech Companies
The Bergbau Forschung which was established in 1958 is the root for the company. After several changes due to spin offs and after the take over from the International Chemical Investors Group, in the period between 2010 and 2013, the original company was split into CarboTech AC GmbH, CarboTech Production GmbH and CarboTech Services GmbH.

References

External links
 Official Website
 International Chemical Investors Group

Companies based in Essen
Chemical companies of Germany
Chemical companies established in 1958
1958 establishments in Germany
Manufacturing companies of Germany